Jean-Marie Alméras (born 13 September 1943 in Montpellier, France) is a French former racing driver and co-founder of Alméras Frères with his brother Jacques Alméras.

References

1943 births
Living people
French racing drivers
24 Hours of Le Mans drivers
World Sportscar Championship drivers
Sportspeople from Montpellier
20th-century French people